Exit is a 2006 Swedish drama film directed by Peter Lindmark. The film premiered at the 2006 Copenhagen International Film Festival.

Cast 
 Mads Mikkelsen as Thomas Skepphult
 Alexander Skarsgård as Fabian von Klerking
 Samuel Fröler as Morgan Nordenstråle
  as Anna Skepphult 
 Börje Ahlstedt as Wilhelm Rahmberg
  as Louise Rahmberg
 Johan Rabaeus as Gabriel Mörk
 Maria Langhammer as Diana Malm
 Henrik Norlén as Åke

References

External links 

2006 drama films
2006 films
Swedish drama films
2000s Swedish-language films
2000s Swedish films